Killer in Close-Up was a blanket title covering four live television drama plays produced by the Australian Broadcasting Commission in 1957 and 1958. It could be seen as the first anthology series produced for Australian television. 

Production of the plays was split equally between the Melbourne and Sydney ABC stations, with the first and fourth being produced in Sydney, the second and third in Melbourne. Each ran for 25 minutes. The plays were produced by Christopher Muir, Raymond Menmuir and Will Sterling.

The title came from the use of the close up in television drama.

The drama plays were based on real-life cases, dramatised for television by George F. Kerr. They were, in order:

 “The Robert Wood Trial” (4/9/57) 
 “The Wallace Case” (20/11/57) 
 “The Rattenbury Case” (18/6/58) 
 “The Trial Of Madeleine Smith” (13/8/58) 

In Melbourne, the play aired against Chesebrough-Ponds Playhouse on HSV-7 (which consisted selections from US anthology series) and Douglas Fairbanks Theatre (aka Douglas Fairbanks Jr Presents, a British-American anthology production) on GTV-9, and was broadcast at 8:30PM. In effect, viewers had a choice of three different half-hour self-contained dramas during that night.

"The Robert Wood Trial"
It was broadcast "live" from Sydney on 4 September 1957, recorded and shown in Melbourne on 4 October 1957. It was directed by Raymond Menmuir.

Plot
Based on the 1907 Camden Town Murder, where Robert Wood was tried for the murder of a prostitute and was acquitted.

Cast
Brian Anderson
Leonard Bullen

Production
The first play used nine sets and twelve actors. The Sydney Morning Herald said its goal was "to show new techniques in Australian TV production and acting."

"The Wallace Case"
The Wallace Case was directed by Christopher Muir in Melbourne. It was broadcast live in that city on 20 November 1957.

Plot
In 1931, William Herbert Wallace is accused of murdering his wife.

Cast
Laurier Lange (aka Laurie Lange) as William Wallace
Noel Howlett as the judge
Brian James as the prosecutor
Norman Griffiths as the defence counsel
John Morgan
Robert Stevens
Campbell Copelin

Production
Muir used close ups extensively to build tension. George F. Kerr came down from Sydney to help with the production and acted asa narrator.

"The Rattenbury Case"
This episode was recorded live in Melbourne and aired on 18 June 1958. It was directed by Will Sterling.

The episode The Rattenbury Case may be held by the National Archives of Australia (per a search of their website).

Plot
Francis Rattenbury, a famous architect, is murdered.

Cast
Patricia Kennedy as Mrs Rattenbury
Edward Brayshaw as Stoner
John Morgan
Neil Fitzpatrick		
James Haggart		
Bettine Kauffmann
Laurie Lange		
Brian Moll		
Wynn Roberts
Nevil Thurgood

Production
It was the first TV performance from experienced actor Patricia Kennedy.

"The Trial of Madeleine Smith"
The play was broadcast "live" from Sydney on 13 August 1958. It aired Melbourne 25 October 1958.

Plot
In 1857 Glasgow, a girl is tried for the murder of her lover. From the first meeting between the lovers to the final verdict in Edinburgh Court.

Cast
Janette Craig as Madeleine Smith
Owen Weingott as Emile L'Angelier
Berys Marsh
Keith Jarvis
Gordon Glenwright
Keith Buckley
Mayne Lynton
Edward Smith
Royston Marcus
George F. Kerr as narrator

Production
Janette Craig was Miss NSW in 1957.

See also
List of live television plays broadcast on Australian Broadcasting Corporation (1950s)

References

External links
Killer in Close-Up on IMDb
'The Robert Wood Trial'' at IMDb
The Wallace Case at IMDb
The Trial of Madeleine Smith at IMDb
The Ratternbury Case at IMDb
The Rattenbury Case at National Archives of Australia
Madeleine Smith at National Archives of Australia

1950s Australian television plays
1957 television plays
Australian Broadcasting Corporation original programming
English-language television shows
Australian live television series
Black-and-white Australian television shows
Australian anthology television series